The Journalist (1884 - 1907) was the first successful American trade newspaper covering journalism.  It was founded as The Journalist: A Magazine for All Who Read and Write by Leander Richardson and Charles Alfred Byrne and published weekly, commencing with its first issue on March 22, 1884.

John Christian Freund became a partner in late 1884, and in January 1885, Charles J. Smith (former managing editor of the New York Star) bought the paper.  Allan Forman was a long-time editor and owner of the paper.

The paper published weekly through March 23, 1895, then suspended and restarted from April 17, 1897 to June 16, 1906, before switching to a monthly publication schedule.

The paper was merged into Editor & Publisher (founded in 1901) in 1907.

References

External links
 
 The Journalist: A Pictorial Souvenir Issued on the Completion of Its Third Year of Continuous Publication (1887)

Publications established in 1884
Defunct newspapers published in New York City
Journalism journals